Hiyy Vanee Inthizaarugai is a Maldivian television series developed for Television Maldives by Mohamed Manik. Produced by Mohamed Abdulla under Movie Dhekedheke Ves Productions, the series stars Mohamed Manik, Sheela Najeeb and Zeenath Abbas in pivotal roles. The entire film was shot in Aa. Rasmaadhoo.

Cast

Main
 Mohamed Manik as Shafiu
 Sheela Najeeb as Suha
 Zeenath Abbas as Zara

Recurring
 Koyya Hassan Manik as Moosa
 Mariyam Haleem as Naseema
 Naashidha Mohamed as Jazlee
 Rifa as Wadheefa
 Abdulla as Arushid

Episodes

Soundtrack

References

Serial drama television series
Maldivian television shows